Ângelo Rafael Oliveira Sousa Taveira (born 13 May 2000) is a Portuguese professional footballer who plays for Farense as a forward.

Football career
He made his LigaPro debut for Farense on 25 August 2019 in a game against Porto B. In January 2020, Taveira was loaned out to Louletano for the rest of the season.

References

External links

2000 births
Living people
Portuguese footballers
Association football forwards
Liga Portugal 2 players
S.C. Farense players
Louletano D.C. players
People from Lagos, Portugal
Sportspeople from Faro District